Duette School is a historic school building in Duette, Florida, United States. Built in 1930, it was listed on the National Register of Historic Places on July 30, 2018.

The school was a two-teacher elementary and middle school teaching first through eighth grades through 1966 and was a one-teacher school for grades 1-4 thereafter until its closing in 2016.

See also
 National Register of Historic Places listings in Manatee County, Florida

References

External links
 School website

Schools in Manatee County, Florida